Santa Rock is a rock, 35 m high, lying 1.5 nautical miles (2.8 km) north-northwest of Vindication Island in the South Sandwich Islands. It was charted and named in 1930 by DI personnel on the Discovery II.

Rock formations of South Georgia and the South Sandwich Islands